Shin Sekai meaning New World in Japanese may refer to:

Places
Shinsekai, a neighborhood in Osaka, Japan

Video Games
Shinsekai: Into the Depths, an adventure video game

Music
Shin Sekaï, French singing / rapping fusion duo 
Shin Sekai ~Real of the World~, debut album of Japanese visual kei rock band Zi:Kill
"Shin Sekai", song by DJ Krush feat. Rino from his 1997 album MiLight 
"Shin Sekai", song by Japanese rock band THE BACK HORN from their 2000 album Yomigaeru Hi 
"Shin Sekai", song by Izabel Varosa from her album Justice
"shinsekai", 2010 album by Japanese rock band Midori

See also
Shin Sekai Yori, the Japanese title of the novel From the New World (novel)